Gerard Robinson (born September 24, 1966) is a former Secretary of Education in Virginia and Florida Education Commissioner. He is a school choice proponent and former president of the Black Alliance for Educational Options. He was selected to be Virginia Secretary of Education for Governor-Elect Bob McDonnell in 2010.

Robinson received an AA from El Camino College, a BA from Howard University and a master's degree in education from Harvard University.

References

External links

 Gerard Robinson and Van Jones: Invest in education, not more prisons
 Robinson: Obama Redefined School Reform for Democrats
 Education is the key to redeeming lives in prison

State cabinet secretaries of Virginia
African-American state cabinet secretaries
Harvard Graduate School of Education alumni
Howard University alumni
Living people
Place of birth missing (living people)
1966 births